Sowkoor Jayaprakash Shetty (April 12, 1935 – September 7, 2015) was an Indian lawyer and politician who was elected as a member of the Karnataka Legislative Assembly from 1967 to 1971. Shetty was born on April 12, 1935 to B. Narayana Shetty, an eminent lawyer, and Rukmini N. Shetty. Shetty was elected as an independent MLA into the Legislative Assembly in 1967 from Brahmavara constituency with a large majority. After retiring from politics at the end of his term, Shetty was involved in activism. He was married to the late Dr. Vishalakshi Shetty. Jayaprakash Shetty died from a prolonged illness on September 7, 2015.

References

1935 births
2015 deaths
20th-century Indian lawyers
Karnataka politicians